Campobasso railway station serves the city and comune of Campobasso, in the region of Molise, southern Italy.  Opened in 1883, it is located on the Termoli–Venafro railway.

The station is currently managed by Rete Ferroviaria Italiana (RFI).  However, the commercial area of the passenger building is managed by Centostazioni.  Train services are operated by Trenitalia.  Each of these companies is a subsidiary of Ferrovie dello Stato (FS), Italy's state-owned rail company.

Location
Campobasso railway station is situated at Piazza Vincenzo Cuoco, close to the city centre.

History

The station was opened on 5 August 1883, upon the inauguration of the Baranello–Campobasso section of the Termoli–Venafro railway and the Benevento–Campobasso railway.

Features
The station has a passenger building arranged on multiple levels.  It houses the ticket office, waiting room, a kiosk, a restaurant and the headquarters of the Railway Police.

The station is attended, and therefore has a room for the management of train movements.

In the station yard are three through tracks used for passenger services.  These tracks are served by two platforms and connected by a pedestrian underpass.

There are other tracks passing through the goods yard, which is equipped with a detached workshop. The station also has a goods shed and locomotive depot.

Passenger and train movements
The station has about one million passenger movements each year.  The majority of the passengers use the Termoli–Campobasso; the Benevento–Campobasso railway has relatively little traffic.

All passenger trains passing through the station stop there. The station is also the originating or terminating point of many trains.  The main destinations are Termoli, Benevento and Pescara Centrale.

See also

History of rail transport in Italy
List of railway stations in Molise
Rail transport in Italy
Railway stations in Italy

References

External links

History and pictures of Campobasso railway station 

This article is based upon a translation of the Italian language version as at December 2010.

Campobasso
Railway stations in Molise
Railway stations opened in 1883
Buildings and structures in the Province of Campobasso